Jean Tavernier (6 March 1928 – 28 November 2020) was a French politician.

Biography
After his studies at the Lycée Montaigne, Tavernier became a radiologist. He served as President of Bordeaux Segalen University from 1979 to 1989 and on the Aquitaine Regional Council starting in 1986. He became President of the council on 11 July 1988 after the resignation of Jacques Chaban-Delmas. He was succeeded by Jacques Valade in 1992.

Jean Tavernier died on 28 November 2020 at the age of 92.

Distinctions
Officer of the Legion of Honour (1996), awarded by Alain Juppé

References

1928 births
2020 deaths
French politicians
French radiologists
Officiers of the Légion d'honneur
Pieds-Noirs
People from Algiers